is a railway station in Yamatotakada, Nara Prefecture, Japan, operated by Kintetsu Railway.

Line
Tsukiyama Station is served by the Osaka Line.

Layout
The station has two side platforms on the ground, serving one track each.

Platforms

Passenger statistics
In recent years, the survey results of passengers using the station were as follows.

Adjacent stations

Surrounding area
Otani Park, built around a small ancient burial mound and with a fountain and pond
Tsukiyama Children's Park, which is also built on a burial mount and is next to the much larger Tsukiyama burial mound, which is not accessible to the public.

See also
 List of railway stations in Japan

References

External links
  

Railway stations in Nara Prefecture